The Wuhan University of Science and Technology (WUST) is a public, comprehensive, research university located in Wuhan, the capital of Hubei province, China. It is a key university established and managed by Hubei province and by the Chinese Ministry of Education.

History
The history of WUST dates back to the Hubei Technical Institute, which was founded in 1898 by Zhang Zhidong in the late Qing Dynasty.

In 1958, it was renamed as Wuhan Iron and Steel University and began to offer four-year degree programs. At that time, it affiliated with the Ministry of Metallurgy. The affiliation was revoked in 1998, and the university is now governed by the Hubei provincial education department and the Ministry of Education.

From 1990 to 1994, the China-Australia Iron and Steel Industry Training Centre was established at the Wuhan Iron and Steel University, as part of a joint venture between the governments of Australia and China. The centre trained over 4500 managers and technicians from the iron and steel industry in a general management course.

In 1995, the college became Wuhan Metallurgy University of Science and Technology with the merger of Wuhan Iron and Steel University, Wuhan Advanced Construction School and Wuhan Medical School of Metallurgy.

In 1999, it became known as Wuhan University of Science and Technology. WUST is authorized to confer 60 bachelor's degree programs, 30 doctoral degree programs, 104 master's degree programs as well as master's degree programs of Engineering in 17 fields. Among those, 15 first-class master's degree were ranked top 50 and 2 first-class master's degrees (Metallurgy Engineering and Mining Engineering) were ranked top 10 by the Degree of Ministry of Education & Postgraduate Education Development Center in 2012.

The university has established many high-level research centers, including one national key laboratories and 12 experimental centers with big enterprises such as Wuhan Iron and Steel Corporation, Panzhihua Iron and Steel, Liuzhou Iron and Steel, and Handan Iron and Steel.

Academics

Schools and Colleges 

School of Materials and Metallurgy
School of Machinery and Automation
School of Resources and Environmental Engineering
School of Information Science and Engineering
School of Computer Science and Technology
School of Chemical Engineering and Technology 
School of Automobile and Traffic Engineering
School of Science
Evergrande School of Management
School of Art and Design
School of Arts, Law and Economics
School of Foreign Language
School of Urban Construction
Medical School
International College
College of Life Sciences and Health

Faculty and Staff 

Staff: 2,600
Faculty: 1,600
Member of Academician of China (double engaged): 8
Member of “Chu Tian Scholar Program” Professor: 32
Member of Professor and Assistant Professor: 900

Notable alumni 

 Xu Jiayin, Chinese billionaire businessman, and chairman of Evergrande Group, a Chinese real estate developer.
 Liu Jie, Academician of the Chinese Academy of Engineering, Former Chancellor of the An steel Group
 Su Yinao, Academician of the Chinese Academy of Engineering
 Liu Benren, Academician Candidate of the Chinese Academy of Engineering, Chancellor of the China Metallurgical Industry Group
 Mao Xinping, Academician of the Chinese Academy of Engineering, Tenured Professor of USTB
 Xie Xianqi, Academician Candidate of the Chinese Academy of Engineering, Dean of Academic committee of Jianghan University

Campus

Qingshan Campus, 947 Heping Avenue, Qingshan District, Wuhan, China
Huangjiahu Campus, Hongshan District, Wuhan, China

Student life

Student demographics
Full-time students: 24,764

Athletics
WUST Women's basketball team has won several national championships in CUBA and won the "President Cup" in the fifth and sixth China University Students Sports meetings successively.

Services

Hospitals
Wuhan Tianyou Hospital (Affiliated Medical College of WUST) category: IIIA | National

Libraries
Founded in 1958, it is one of the large libraries in the universities in Hubei Province.
The Library in Qingshan Old Campus has seven floors, occupying an area of 11,000 square meters, plus the library branch in School of Construction and School of Medicine, the total area can achieve 16,000 square meters. The library has 20 reading rooms, and 2,400 reading seat, can receive at a maximum of 4,000 readers every day. It is the orange building in the top photo.
Nowadays, the whole library stores about 1,000,000 literature, of which 880,000 books, foreign periodicals about 100,000 volumes, video literature 1,000 copies, electrical literature 8,000 kinds. Every year, 1,200 kinds of Chinese and foreign literature are subscribed, and the amount increases at the speed of 12,000 volumes per year.

Cooperative Educational Institutions

University of Pittsburgh
Washburn University
University of Bridgeport
Hanyang University

References

External links
Wuhan University of Science and Technology (English)
Wuhan University of Science and Technology (Chinese)

Universities and colleges in Wuhan
Technical universities and colleges in China